WHCB is a Religious formatted broadcast radio station licensed to Bristol, Tennessee, serving the Tri-Cities, VA/TN area.  WHCB is owned and operated by Appalachian Educational Communications Corp.

External links
 WHCB Radio Online
 

HCB
1999 establishments in Tennessee
Radio stations established in 1999